A Pattern of Roses is a 1972 children's novel by British author K. M. Peyton, about a mystery and a ghost. It was issued in the US under the title So Once Was I in 1975, but subsequent editions have used the original title.

The novel was made into a television film in 1983. The film was the first significant on screen role for Helena Bonham Carter; the cast also included Philip Jackson and Suzanna Hamilton.

Plot summary
While his parents are renovating a cottage in an English village, Tim Ingram uncovers a mystery about the 15-year-old boy who once lived in the house and died in 1910 (1914 in the movie). With the help of his friend Rebecca, Tim investigates, but finds events from the past being mirrored in his own life.

References

1972 British novels
British children's novels
Novels by K. M. Peyton
British novels adapted into films
1972 children's books
Oxford University Press books